The Sands of Time is a 1996 Virgin Missing Adventures original novel written by Justin Richards based on the long-running British science fiction television series Doctor Who. It features the Fifth Doctor, Nyssa, and Tegan. The story is a sequel to the 1975 Fourth Doctor Pyramids of Mars and once again features the Osirans.

Plot
Visiting the British Museum, Nyssa is soon kidnapped leaving the Doctor and Tegan to face the consequences of an ancient Egyptian prophecy.

External links
The Cloister Library - The Sands of Time

1996 British novels
1996 science fiction novels
Fifth Doctor novels
Virgin Missing Adventures
Novels by Justin Richards
Fiction set in 1896
Fiction set in 1996